The 2000–01 Florida Panthers season was their eighth season in the National Hockey League. After making the playoffs in 2000, the Panthers failed to qualify for the playoffs in 2001.

Regular season

Final standings

Schedule and results

Player statistics

Awards and records

Transactions

Draft picks
Florida's draft picks at the 2000 NHL Entry Draft held at the Pengrowth Saddledome in Calgary, Alberta.

See also
2000–01 NHL season

References
 

Flo
Flo
Florida Panthers seasons
Florida Panthers
Florida Panthers